Culture Clash Live! is the second live album by The Aristocrats, released on January 20, 2015. The material for this live release was recorded at six different venues in six countries during the 2014 world tour supporting the band's second studio album Culture Clash. The album will be released as a CD/DVD package. Only three tracks are the same performance on both discs, all others are "unique, giving fans a chance to hear how the songs evolved while on tour".

Track listing

CD

DVD

Notes
 Recorded at The Center Theater, Whittier, California on January 25, 2014.
 Recorded at Centro Cultural Roberto Cantoral, Mexico City, Mexico on January 28, 2014.
 Recorded at Band on the Wall, Manchester, UK on February 20, 2014.
 Recorded at De Boerderij, Zoetermeer, Netherlands on February 28, 2014.
 Recorded at Askra Theater, Bangkok, Thailand on August 17, 2014.
 Recorded at Club Citta, Tokyo, Japan on August 19, 2014.

DVD extras
 Behind the scenes tour at Tokyo venue
 Drum solo by Minnemann with switchable camera angles
 Song demos from Culture Clash album

Personnel
Guthrie Govan – guitar
Bryan Beller – bass
Marco Minnemann – drums

References

2015 live albums
Live jazz fusion albums
The Aristocrats (band) albums